Abandon is the sixteenth studio album by the British hard rock band Deep Purple, released in the Spring of 1998. It was Deep Purple's second album with Steve Morse on guitar and the last album to feature founding member Jon Lord prior to his departure in 2002.

The album was followed by a successful 1998/1999 world tour which brought Deep Purple to Australia for the first time in 15 years. In 1999 a live album and DVD Total Abandon: Australia '99 recorded in Melbourne on 20 April 1999 was released.

The album title is actually a pun from Ian Gillan – "A Band On" – and the album was followed by the "A Band on Tour". It featured a reworking of a previously recorded song – "Bloodsucker" from Deep Purple in Rock (here spelled "Bludsucker"). "Don't Make Me Happy" was mistakenly mastered in mono and not amended on the album, one of the two versions of the song released on a promotional single was mastered in stereo.

Track listing

Personnel
Deep Purple
 Ian Gillan – vocals
 Steve Morse – guitar
 Jon Lord – keyboards
 Roger Glover – bass
 Ian Paice – drums

Production notes
 Recorded at Greg Rike Studios, Altamonte Springs, Florida, 1997/1998
 Produced by Deep Purple and Roger Glover
 Engineered by Darren Schneider
 Additional engineering by Keith Andrews
 Mixed at Platinum Post Studios, Orlando, Florida by Darren Schneider
 Assistant engineer – Kent Huffnagle with Shannon Brady
 Mastered at Masterdisk, New York by Greg Calbi

Charts

References

Deep Purple albums
1998 albums
Albums produced by Roger Glover
CMC International albums
EMI Records albums